Širákov is a village and municipality in the Veľký Krtíš District of the Banská Bystrica Region of southern Slovakia.

External links
Statistics 

Villages and municipalities in Veľký Krtíš District